Max Andrew Bumgardner (May 13, 1923 – April 12, 2005) was an American football player and coach. After playing college football as an end at the University of Texas at Austin, where he earned a Bachelor of Science degree in physical education in 1948, he was selected in the first round of the 1948 NFL Draft by the Chicago Bears, but was sent to the Detroit Lions. He played for just one season in the National  Football League (NFL), with the Lions.

Bumgardner began his coaching career in 1949 at Denison High School in Denison, Texas, where he worked as an assistant under head football coach Les Cranfill. In 1950, he was hired as the head football coach and athletic director at San Angelo College—now known as Angelo State University—in San Angelo, Texas. Bumgardner remained in that post until he resigned in 1968, after the school had become a four-year college and was renamed as Angelo State College.

Head coaching record

College

See also
 List of Texas Longhorns football All-Americans
 List of Chicago Bears first-round draft picks

References

External links
 
 

1923 births
2005 deaths
American football defensive ends
American football ends
Angelo State Rams athletic directors
Angelo State Rams football coaches
Detroit Lions players
Texas Longhorns football players
High school football coaches in Texas
Junior college athletic directors in the United States
Junior college football coaches in the United States
People from Wichita Falls, Texas
Coaches of American football from Texas
Players of American football from Texas